Tamridaea is a genus of flowering plant in the family Rubiaceae. Its only species is Tamridaea capsulifera. It is endemic to Yemen. Its natural habitat is rocky areas.

References

Sabiceeae
Taxa named by Birgitta Bremer